Windows Setup is an installer that prepares a hard disk drive for a Microsoft Windows operating system installation by executing two processes: a) initializing the drive and b) copying system files to that drive in order for the operating system to be run locally (see Volume). The early versions of Windows required an existing compatible version of DOS operating system in order to be installed. The Windows NT family, from 3.1 through 6.0 featured text-based installation that prompted users to a GUI wizard in the final steps. The 9x family installer was similar to NT despite it being MS-DOS-based. Additionally, it did not need preinstalled DOS as a requirement. With the release of Windows NT 6.0 (Vista), Microsoft introduced a fully graphical setup environment and UEFI support (partial in Windows Vista and 7, full UEFI support on Windows 8 onwards).

Windows 1.x and Windows 2.x
The installation of Windows 1.x, Windows 2.0, Windows 2.1x requires that a compatible version of MS-DOS is installed. The user must specify any hardware such as mice or printers during installation. After the installation, Windows was to be started either manually by typing "WIN.COM" at the command prompt, or configured for automatic startup by adding WIN.COM to the end of AUTOEXEC.BAT.

Windows 3.x
The installation of Windows 3.0, Windows 3.1x and Windows 3.2 requires that a compatible DOS operating system is already installed. The installer attempts to detect network cards, mice, and other hardware on its own but will rely on the user to specify hardware if it cannot find them. After the installation, Windows was to be started either manually by typing "WIN.COM" at the command prompt, or configured for automatic startup by adding WIN.COM to the end of AUTOEXEC.BAT.

Windows 9x
Windows 95-98 and Windows Me do not require MS-DOS. The first phase of setup prepares the hard disk partition for use by Windows by formatting it to a compatible file system, then runs scandisk, and, if the hard disk appears to be ready for installation in terms of free space and disk integrity, then it will copy files to the selected installation folder (typically C:\WINDOWS). The first phase of setup resembles the interface of Windows 3.x. Once this phase is finished, the computer reboots and setup resumes from the hard disk, but still requires the installation media to continue copying files and drivers. At this point the user will be asked to provide a product key.

Windows NT

Before Windows Vista
The setup process introduced with Windows NT 3.1 remained in effect until the release of Windows Vista. The general process is:
 The user inserts the installation media, initiates the process, and Setup loads various hardware and file-system drivers.
 If any third-party drivers are needed in order to detect an SCSI or RAID system, setup pauses and requests the supply of a driver on a floppy disk. See F6 disk.
 The user is then presented with a text-based interface which gives three options 1) install Windows, 2) repair an existing installation, or 3) quit setup.
 If the user decides to install Windows, he/she is presented with an agreement that they must accept before Setup will continue. Prior to Windows 2000, the user was required to scroll to the bottom of the agreement before they were permitted to agree.
 The user must create or select a partition, then a filesystem (either NTFS or FAT). If either of these file systems is already present and there is no version of Windows already on the disk, it is also possible to leave the current file system intact.
 The hard disk is checked for errors and space requirements, then, if it passes the check, Windows will be installed.
 After the text-based phase of Setup is finished, the computer reboots and starts a graphical phase of setup from the hard disk, prompting the user to reinsert the installation media, to enter the product key, and then it continues copying files and drivers.

All versions of Windows NT up to Windows Server 2003, except for Windows XP Home Edition, prompt the user to enter an Administrator password.

On Windows 2000, Windows XP and Windows Server 2003, the Recovery Console is included to repair damaged installations. It allows the user to repair disk and boot record errors, and copy missing or corrupted files to the destination folders.

After Windows Vista
Windows Vista and subsequent operating systems all utilize Windows Preinstallation Environment (Windows PE) as the installation environment. Windows PE features a graphical user interface with mouse support from the beginning, rather than requiring a text-only phase as in previous versions. The concept of F6 disks has been improved to provide support for computers without floppy drives; the loading of drivers from CD-ROMs and USB flash drives is now supported. Support for installing Windows onto FAT partitions has been dropped; Windows must be installed onto an NTFS partition.

Windows 8 and later
Windows 8 introduces a new secondary installer known as the Upgrade Assistant, replacing Windows Setup for upgrade installations. Designed to be simpler and faster than previous installation methods, it analyses the system's hardware and software for compatibility with Windows 8, allows the user to purchase, download, and install the operating system, and migrate files and settings from the previous Windows installation in the case of a clean install. Windows Setup is still used when booting from installation media.

References

Windows components
Installation software